Mạc Phúc Nguyên (chữ Hán: 莫福源, ? – December 1561), also known as Mạc Tuyên Tông (莫宣宗), was an emperor of Vietnam's Mạc dynasty who reigned from 1546 to 1561.

Biography
In July 1557, Mạc Phúc Nguyên ordered his general Mạc Kính Điển to attack rebels in Thanh Hóa Province, but the attack failed and following a rearguard attack on Sơn Tây, Tuyên Quang, Hưng Hoá, Kinh Băc, and Hải Dương provinces Mạc Phúc Nguyên had to fall back to his capital at Đông Đô. He died of smallpox four years later.

He was preceded by Mạc Hiến Tông and succeeded by Mạc Mậu Hợp.

Sources

Bibliography
 Đại Việt Thông Sử, Lê Quý Đôn (1759)

1561 deaths
Mạc dynasty emperors
Year of birth unknown
Vietnamese monarchs